Hooman Barghnavard (born December 26, 1969) is an Iranian actor. He has received various accolades, including nominations for two Hafez Awards and an Iran Cinema Celebration Award.

Filmography

Cinema
The Queen
Bonbaste Vosogh
Boofe Koor
Nargese Mast
Cinema Nimkat
Arayeshe Ghaliz
Bigane
Adanm Ahani
Malake
Gonah karan 
Keifar 
Yek Tekke nan
Inja Shahre Digarist
Bi khodahafezi
Jib bor haye Khiaban Jonobi
Loone Zanbur
Blade and Termeh

Series
Jeyran
Doordast ha
Ghore 
Padari
Dood kesh
Zamane
Dozdo Police
Faktor 8 
Bidari
Cheke Bargashti
In the Strand of Zayandeh Rud
Bagh Shishe′ei
Rooz Haye Bad Be Dar
Pejman
Sakhtemane Pezeshkan

References

External links
 

Living people
1960 births
Iranian male television actors
Iranian male film actors
Iranian male stage actors
Male actors from Tehran